Fadlun ibn Fadl, or Fadl III was the last ruler of the Kurdish Shaddadids of Arran from Ganja, which is in present-day Azerbaijan. He ruled from 1073 to 1075, until the Seljuk Sultan Malik-Shah removed him from power, giving him Astarabad. The realm was then absorbed by the Great Seljuqs, placing Sav-Tegin as governor of Ganja. 

Following the death of Sav-Tegin in 1085, Fadl instigated a revolt and gained possession of Ganja. Malik-Shah launched a campaign in 1086 and removed Fadl from power again. Ebn al-Aṯir mentions a Fadl then died in poverty in Baghdad in 1091, but if it was him or his father is in doubt. A collateral line of Shaddadids, through Manuchihr ibn Shavur, continued to rule in Ani.

References

Emirs of Ganja
Kurdish rulers
Shaddadids
11th-century rulers in Asia
11th-century Kurdish people